The 1971 Kentucky Derby was the 97th running of the Kentucky Derby. The race took place on May 1, 1971, with 123,284 people in attendance.

Full results

 Winning Breeder: Edward B. Benjamin; (KY)

References

1971
Kentucky Derby
Derby
Kentucky
Kentucky Derby